The  is a subway line forming part of the Nagoya Municipal Subway system in Nagoya, Japan, operated by Transportation Bureau City of Nagoya. It is a loop line that runs from Kanayama, via Sakae, Ōzone, Nagoya Daigaku, and back to Kanayama, all within Nagoya. The Meijō Line color on maps is wisteria purple. Its stations are numbered with the prefix "M". All the stations accept manaca, a rechargeable contactless smart card.

This is the second loop subway line built in Japan, after Toei Ōedo Line. The Ōedo Line, however, is not a true loop line as it is operated like a 6 lying on its side, with trains from the western Hikarigaoka terminus running anticlockwise around the loop and terminating at Tochōmae Station and then returning around the loop to Hikarigaoka. Thus the Meijō Line is the first (and currently the only) true loop subway line in the nation. The line is longer than the JR Ōsaka Loop Line, but shorter than the JR Yamanote Line. It takes 48 minutes to complete the loop.

Stations 

1: Planned lines.
2: Through service to/from Meijō Line.

Meikō Line

The  is a subway line forming part of the Nagoya Municipal Subway system in Nagoya, Japan, operated by Transportation Bureau City of Nagoya. It runs from Kanayama Station in Naka Ward to Nagoyako Station in Minato Ward, all within Nagoya. The Meikō Line color on maps is a stripe of wisteria purple and white. Its stations are numbered with the prefix "E". All the stations accept manaca, a rechargeable contactless smart card. The line has through services with the Meijō Line.

Stations

History
The line was originally the part of Meijō Line. When Line 4, the eastern part of the current loop line, was completed in 2004, the whole of the loop (consisting of part of Line 2 and line 4) was renamed the Meijō Line, and the remaining section between Kanayama and Nagoyakō, outside the loop, became the Meikō Line.

Women-only cars were introduced on the line on 4 July 2016, operating in the mornings until 09:00.

Rolling stock

Current

 2000 series (since 1989)

Former

 1000/1100/1200 series (from 1965 until 2000)

History
The first section of Line 2, between Sakae-machi (current Sakae) and Shiyakusho, opened in 1965. The line was named Meijō Line in 1969, and the extension was completed in 1971. Line 4 opened its first section between Aratama-bashi and Kanayama in 1974. The line extension was completed in 2004, making a loop line together with Line 2. At the same time, the whole loop line was renamed the Meijō Line, and the section of Line 2 between Kanayama and Nagoyakō, outside the loop, became the Meikō Line.

Women-only cars were introduced on the line on 4 July 2016, operating in the mornings until 09:00.

See also
List of railway lines in Japan

References

External links
 Transportation Bureau City of Nagoya official website  

Nagoya Municipal Subway
Standard gauge railways in Japan
Railway loop lines
Railway lines opened in 1965
600 V DC railway electrification
Railway lines opened in 1971